Connie Imboden was born in 1953 and is an American photographer known for her work in nudes, using reflections in water and mirrors. Her photographs are represented in many collections including The Museum of Modern Art in New York, The Museum of Modern Art in San Francisco, The Philadelphia Museum of Art, Bibliothèque nationale de France in Paris, the Ludwig Museum in Cologne, Germany, as well as many other public and private collections throughout Europe and the Americas.

Imboden has shown her photography work in groups and solo shows at galleries and museums throughout the United States, South America, Europe and China.

Connie Imboden's first book, Out of Darkness, with essays compiled by Charles-Henri Favrod and A.D. Coleman, which won the Silver Medal in Switzerland's "Schonste Bucher Aus Aller Welt (Most Beautiful Book in the World)" Award in 1993.

Following "Out of Darkness", Imboden released two monographs in 1999. The first, "Beauty of Darkness", features 80 images of her work produced between 1986 and 1998. It also featured introductions by A.D. Coleman and Arthur Ollman. The second book, "The Raw Seduction of Flesh", features work produced in 1998 and an introduction by Mitchell Snow.

Her most recent monograph, "Reflections; 25 Years of Photography", was published in 2009 by Insight Editions with essays by Arthur Ollman, Julian Cox and John Wood.

Connie Imboden was an instructor at the Maryland Institute College of Art, where her experience as a photographer began, and has also taught at the Maine Photographic Workshops, the International Center of Photography in New York City, the Center for Photography in Woodstock, the Fine Arts Work Center in Provincetown, the Rencontres Internationales de la Photographie in France, and the Santa Fe Photographic Workshops.

Early work
Imboden was introduced to photography during the summer following her junior year of high school when she enrolled in a Basic Photography course at the Maryland Institute College of Art. Previously showing no interest in art, she was inspired by Diane Arbus's work and her expression through photography.  It quickly became a passionate pursuit that would last a lifetime.

Experimenting with negatives by cutting, scratching, and melting them, Imboden's early images are introspective self-portraits that show early signs of the psychological qualities that would eventually become characteristic of her work.  Many of these photographs depict the representation of masks, another recurring theme through Imboden's career.

Working with water

Imboden's work with water began in 1983, while out photographing, she became intrigued by specular bursts of sunlight bouncing off puddles after a heavy rain.  She continued to explore the reflective properties of water until one day a friend volunteered to model nude in a stream Imboden had been photographing in.  The human form, distorted, reflected, and transformed as it was submerged in water, would eventually become the inspiration for her life's work.

Imboden would continually discover new ways to explore her subject matter.  Her early images incorporate the moving water of streams or the unavoidable reflection of trees. These are graphic elements that further transform the figure in ways that heighten the psychological aspect of the work.  Later, in images such as Dead Silences I & II, Imboden photographed above the surface of a black lined kiddie pool, which improved the visibility of the reflection as well as the magnification and refraction of the water.  The images working with this method illustrate elongated forms, fluid and often tranquil due to the stillness of the water.

Imboden's work with the human form and water incorporate three distinct layers; the body above the surface of the water, its reflection, and the body submerged.  When she eventually began photographing underwater, she would also use the meniscus of the water to further distort and transform the body.  Her images throughout the years of 1997–2000 feature bizarre, organic forms – familiar in their flesh but alien in their reconstructed form.  In an interview, Imboden is quoted as saying "... there is nothing more repulsive nor more attractive to us than flesh. This confrontation with flesh in an unidentified form makes us uncomfortable. We don’t know what we are looking at, but we know it is human.”

Working with mirrors

Photographing models in water was not an option during the cold winter months for Imboden. To continue to deal with reflections and human figures throughout the year, she began using mirrors in 1989." The problem was that the mirrors only provided one reflective layer, instead of the three. She had grown accustomed to working with what models that displayed potential to distort and transform the figure. Her early attempts at disrupting the clean and crisp reflections involved smearing oil on the mirror's surface, as seen in Untitled #2455.

Seeking to alter the surface even further, Imboden, began scratching the silver backing off of the mirrors she was working with and making them transparent in some places while still reflective in others. Putting a model behind the mirror made them visible in the areas where the mirror was transparent, a model in front can be seen in the parts that are still reflective. Through the relationship of the models in front of and behind the mirror, as well as her camera angle, she discovered a similar effect to the refractive properties of the water. In the only self-portrait she produced since the 1970s, Self Portrait 1990, Imboden, imperfectly lines up her profile in front of the mirror with a models face behind the mirror, creating a distorted portrait by combining two different views into one, reminiscent of the quality of space in a Cubist painting.

The smearing and scraping of the mirrors soon lead to generating a marred, scratched texture on their surface. Resembling the "hatching" technique in medieval printmaking. Many of Imboden's images that illustrate this texture have a dark, mythological quality to them, as in Untitled #3573. By incorporating this texture with the model showing through from behind the mirror and the one reflected in front, Imboden was once again working with three distinct layers.

Personal life
Imboden is married to Patricia Dwyer. The couple live in Maryland.

Education, teaching experience, and boards/affiliations
Source: Maryland Institute College of Art

Education

1986–1988
 Master of Fine Arts, University of Delaware, Newark, Delaware

1977–1978
 Bachelor of Science, summa cum laude, Towson State University, Baltimore, Maryland

1971–1973
 Maryland Institute College of Art, Baltimore, Maryland

Teaching Experience

2002–present
 Santa Fe Workshops, Santa Fe, New Mexico

1996–present
 Maryland Institute College of Art, Baltimore, Maryland

1995–present
 School for Photographic Studies in Prague, Czech Republic

1993–present
 Maine Photographic Workshops, Rockport, Maine

1997
 International Center For Photography, New York City

1995
 Center for Photography in Woodstock, New York

1994
 Recontres Internationales de la Photographie Workshop, Arles, France

Collections
Source: Maryland Institute College of Art
 The Museum of Modern Art, New York City
 The Museum of Photographic Arts, San Diego, California
 The San Francisco Museum of Modern Art, California
 The Philadelphia Museum of Art, Pennsylvania
 Virginia Museum of Fine Arts, Richmond, Virginia
 The National Museum of Women in the Arts, Washington D.C.
 The Museum of Photography, Helsinki, Finland
 Museo Alejandro Otero, Caracas, Venezuela
 The National Museum of American Art, Washington D.C.
 The Baltimore Museum of Art, Baltimore, Maryland
 The Bryn Mawr College, Bryn Mawr, Pennsylvania
 The Bibliothèque Nationale, Paris, France
 The Bibliothèque Lyonnaise, Lyon, France
 The Corcoran Gallery, Washington D.C.
 Museum of Fine Arts, Houston, Texas
 Kresge Art Museum, East Lansing, Michigan
 Galerie du Chateau d'eau, Toulouse, France
 Galleria e libreria dell'immagine, Milan, Italy
 Lehigh University, Bethlehem, Pennsylvania
 L'oeil Quiperios, Quimper, France
 Ludwig Museum, Cologne, Germany

Selected solo exhibitions
Source: Maryland Institute College of Art

2016
 Y:Art Gallery, Baltimore, MD

2015
 Infocus Galerie, Cologne, Germany

2014
 Almlof Gallery, Malmö, Sweden
 JRB Art at The Elms, Oklahoma City, OK

2013
 Nordic Light Festival, Kristensund, Norway 2011 – Saul Mednick Gallery, Philadelphia, Pennsylvania

2010
 Hargate Gallery, Concord, Massachusetts

2009
 Maine Art Museum, Bangor, Maine
 See+ Art Gallery, Beijing, China
 Heineman Myers Contemporary Art, Bethesda, Maryland Delaware Center for Contemporary Art, Wilmington, Delaware

2008
 Mesa Contemporary Arts Center, Mesa, Arizona Museo de Arte Contemporaneo, Valdivia, Chile Universidad de Chilie, Santiago, Chile
 Centro de la Photographie, Lima, Peru

2007
 Museo Metropolitano, Buenos Aires, Argentina Universidad Mayor, Temeco, Chile
 James Gallery, Pittsburgh, Pennsylvania

2006
 Heineman Meyers, Bethesda, Maryland

2005
 Esther Woerdehoff Galerie, Paris, France
 Infocus Galerie, Cologne, Germany 2004 – Volakis Gallery, Nappa, California

2004
 Volakis Gallery, Nappa, California

2003
 Packard & Wreath Gallery, Lewes, Delaware
 Gomez Gallery, Baltimore, Maryland
 McDaniel College, Westminster, Maryland

2002
 Trinity Gallery, Atlanta, Georgia

2001
 Museum of Photographic Arts, San Diego, California
 JJ Brookings Gallery, San Francisco, California
 Galerie Waldburger, Berlin, Germany
 Gomez Gallery, Baltimore, Maryland
 Edward Carter Gallery, Lewes, Delaware
 Chiaroscuro Gallery, Santa Fe, New Mexico

2000
 Centro de la Fotographia, Lima, Peru
 Infocus Gallery, Cologne, Germany
 JJ Brookings Gallery, San Francisco, California
 Bassetti Fine Art Photographs, New Orleans, Louisiana
 Emma Molina Galerie, Monterey, Mexico

1999
 Gomez Gallery Baltimore, Maryland
 Esther Woerdehoff Galerie, Paris, France
 Alan Klotz PhotoCollect New York City
 George Mason University, The Johnson Center and FineArts Galleries, Fairfax, Virginia

1998
 Gomez Gallery, Baltimore, Maryland

1997
 Museo de Arte Contemporaneo de Panama
 Museo de las Americas, San Juan, Puerto Rico
 Infocus Gallery, Cologne, Germany
 Gomez Gallery, Baltimore, Maryland
 Museo de Barquisimento, Venezuela
 Museo de Arte Costarricense, San Jose, Costa Rica
 Galeria del Ateneo de Valencia, Valencia, Venezuela

1996
 Gomez Gallery, Baltimore, Maryland
 Museo Alejandro Otero, Caracas, Venezuela
 Witkin Gallery, New York City

1995
 ThirdEye Photoworks, The Internet
 Imagery Gallery, Lancaster, Ohio

1994
 Gomez Gallery, Baltimore, Maryland
 Gallery Finfoto, Helsinki, Finland
 Galleria 13, Espace Van Gogh, Arles, France
 Braggiotti Gallery, Amsterdam, Netherlands
 Galleria e libreria dell'immagine, Milan, Italy
 The University of Notre Dame, Indiana

1993
 Galerie du Chateau d'eau, Toulouse, France
 Imagery Gallery, Lancaster, Ohio
 Arlington Arts Center, Arlington, Virginia
 Washington Center for Photography, Washington D.C.
 Franklin and Marshall College, Lancaster, Pennsylvania

1992
 Witkin Gallery, New York City
 Suzel Berna Gallery, Paris, France
 Grauwert Gallery, Hamburg, German
 Towson State University, Baltimore, Maryland

1991
 Momediano Gallerie de Arte, Madrid, Spain
 New Works Gallery, University of Illinois at Chicago
 The University of the Arts, Philadelphia, Pennsylvania
 The Nye Gomez Gallery, Baltimore, Maryland
 Blatant Image/Silver Eye, Pittsburgh, Pennsylvania

1990
 Photo West Gallery, San Diego, California
 Iris Gallery, Boca Raton, Florida

1989
 Michigan State University, East Lansing, Michigan
 Kansas City Art Institute, Kansas City, Missouri

1988
 The Rosenberg Gallery, Baltimore, Maryland
 The Booktrader's Gallery, Philadelphia, Pennsylvania

Monographs and catalogues
Source: Maryland Institute College of Art

2009
 Reflections: 25 Years of Photography by Connie Imboden, published by Insight Editions. Preface by Julian Cox, foreword by John Wood, Introduction by Arthur Ollman

2007
 Connie Imboden, La Oscuridad Divina Catalogue Museo Metropolitano

2006
 Connie Imboden: Re-Fromation, catalogue

2003
 Imboden Photographs Catalogue

2001
 Piercing Illusions, Published by Foto Books Press, San Francisco & New York, text by John Wood, Interview by John Weiss

1999
 Beauty of Darkness, Monograph published by Custom and Limited Editions Text by Arthur Ollman, and A.D.Coleman
 Raw Seduction of Flesh Monograph published by Silver Arts, London England Text by Mitchell Snow

1998
 Inter U terus Catalogue, Published By Gomez Gallery

1996
 "Connie Imboden" Catalog for Museo Alejandro Otero

1993
 Connie Imboden Conversation by Jean–Claude Lemagny, Text by Robert Pujade, Published by GalerieMunicipale du Chateau d'Eau, Toulouse, France.

1992
 Out of Darkness by Connie Imboden. Text by AD Coleman and Charles Henri Favrod Edited and published by Esther Woerdehoff, Zurich and Paris. Printed in Switzerland.

Publications
Source: Maryland Institute College of Art

2018

 Plethora Magazine, "Issue #7: Automation", Copenhagen, Denmark

2017

 Baltimore Magazine, "The Puppet Master" by Gabriella Souza, February 2017
 The OD Review, "v2.18 / Connie Imboden’s Infirm Delight"

2016

 BmoreArt, "Conversations" Episode #15: Connie Imboden, Interview with Liz Donadio
 The Baltimore Sun, October 14, Interview with Tim Smith

2015

 ">>Love is…<<", inFocus galerie catalogue
 Little Patuxent Review, COVER Feature, Issue 17-Winter 2015
 The Stone Mag: unveiling the secrets of transmutation, 2015 n. 0

2014

 The Photographer’s Playbook: 307 Assignments and Ideas 
 NORMAL Magazine, No. 4, Autumn 2014

2013

 FOTO, "Connie Imboden, Reflections of Man" October 2013

2010

 Georgia Review, "Danse Macabre". Front and back cover and inside portfolio

2008

 Focus Magazine, "Fire and Water" 1/8/08
 RS Magazine, "Connie Imboden" June 2008

2007

 Foto Mundo, "La Oscuradad Divina" June 2007 2006 – Baltimore Sun, Wednesday April 12, Arts & Society 2005 – Inked Magazine, cover, Spring Premiere Issue

2003

 Baltimore Sun, November 2, Arts & Society
 Baltimore City Paper, December 3, 2003 " Art"
 Towson Times, December 3, 2003, Life Times

2002

 Ag, Volume November 29, 2002, "Running Deeper: The Metamorphes of Connie Imboden," A.D. Coleman
 Photovision: Art & Technique
 Foto & Video February 2002

2001

 Zoom, July 2001 "Connie Imboden", David Crosby
 PHOTOgraphic, July 2001 "Connie Imboden: Troubled Waters", Jay Jorgensen

2000

 B&W Magazine, June 2000 "Connie Imboden Body Transformer" Shawn O'Sullivan, Issue 7
 Photographie, June 2000 "Connie Imboden" PortfolioPhotoPlus, June 2000 "THE BODY, Distortions and Realities" Ghislaine De La Villeguerin

1999

 Baltimore Magazine, Sept 1999, "Connie Imboden"
 Baltimore Sunday Sun, September 12, Arts and Society "Body Language" Glenn McNatt
 Photo Metro, Vol17 Issue 155 "Connie Imboden"

1998

 The Photo Review, Fall 1998, Vol 21 #4, "Connie Imboden" by Susan Ciccotti
 Master Breasts, Aperture Publishing, New York City

1997

 Leg, Donna Karan Inc., General Publishing Group

1995

 Women Artists, The National Museum of Women in the Arts, Susan Fisher Sterling
 Zoom Magazine, Milan, Italy
 Photodom Magazine January "Connie Imboden: Out Of Darkness", Taiwan

1994

 Valokuva Finnish Photography, November, "Connie Imboden Vesi Ja Peili" Helsinki Finland
 Tradition and the Unpredictable, Catalog for the show at the Museum of Fine Arts, Houston, Texas
 Photographies Magazine. January, "Connie Imboden" Milan, Italy

1993

 ViewCamera, September/October, "Connie Imboden –Beneath the Surface", Sacramento, California
 Photo Review, Winter, "Connie Imboden: An Interview", Philadelphia, Pennsylvania

1992

 Photovision, "Archeology of the Body", #23, Sevilla, Spain
 La Foltgrafia, "Reflejos en el Agua", Issue #23, Barcelona, Spain
 Vis a Vis, "acquisitions de la Bibliotheque Nationale", Issue #10, Paris, France
 Photonews, "Imboden: Ein Spiegel nach innen", April, Hamburg, Germany

1991

 Fotopractica, January, Milan, Italy Fotografisk Tidskrift, May Stockholm, Sweden
 Photoblatter, "Connie Imboden: Korper im Wasser", August, Frankfurt, Germany
 Camera and Darkroom, August, Beverly Hills, California
 Idea Magazine, "New Wave Nude Photos", January, Tokyo, Japan

1990

 Popular Photography, "They Still Shoot Nudes Don't They", October, New York City
 Insight Magazine, February, Bristol, Rhode Island

1989

 Photo Metro Magazine, January, San Francisco, California
 Photo Design Magazine, February, New York City

1988

 Swimmers, Aperture, June, New York City
 Exploring Black and White Photography, by Arnold Gasson. Brown Publishers, Dubuque, Iowa
 Photo Review, Winter, "Deep Waters – The Photographs of Connie Imboden", Philadelphia, Pennsylvania
 Photo Review, Spring, "The Delaware Portfolio" Philadelphia, Pennsylvania

1987

 Photo Review, Summer, Philadelphia, Pennsylvania

Works
 Beauty Of Darkness, Custom & limited ed., 1999, 
 The raw seduction of flesh, Silver Arts, 1999, 
 Reflections: 25 Years of Photography, Insight Editions, 2009,

Reviews
 "Bodies of Water", Baltimore City Paper, Mike Giuliano, May 17, 2000

References

External links
 Artist's website
 Connie Imboden: Interview by Susan Ludvigson
 https://www.pbs.org/wnet/egg/315/imboden/index.html

1953 births
Living people
American photographers
Maryland Institute College of Art faculty
American women photographers
Towson University alumni
American lesbian artists
American women academics
21st-century American LGBT people
21st-century American women artists